Gum guaicum, or guaiac resin, is a substance produced from the tree species Guaiacum officinale. It is registered as food additive: as a preservative under the E number E241, and as an antioxidant under E314.

Guaiac resin is also used medically for the stool guaiac test.

Chemically, it is mixture of approximately 70% alpha- and beta-guaiaconic acids, 10% guaiaretic acid, 15% guaiac beta-resin, and small quantities of other chemical compounds such as guaiac yellow and vanillin.

References 

Natural gums
Food antioxidants